The following radio stations broadcast on AM frequency 1680 kHz: 1680 AM is a Regional broadcast frequency.

México
 XECSIC-AM in Morelia, Michoacán

United States
All stations operate with 10 kW during the daytime and are Class B stations.

External links

 Radio Locator list of stations on 1680
 FCC list of radio stations on 1680 kHz

References

Lists of radio stations by frequency